Jean-Pierre Bérenger (1737– June, 1807) was a Swiss editor, historian, translator and pamphletist.

He was born in Geneva to a family not native to the city, hence lacking citizenship. He studied in Geneva, and appears to have led a movement to gain political rights for similar residents, prompting his exile in 1770 by the Council of Ten. He moved to Lausanne, where he began to write. He was allowed to return to Geneva in 1781, where he successfully continued to agitate for participation. He corresponded by mail frequently with Benjamin Franklin.

Among his works, either written or edited, were:.
Il quadro storico e politico delle Ginevra nel XVIII secolo by Francis d'Yvernois, (1782)
Geografia di Busching, compendiata negli oggeti piu rilevanti, aumentat in quei che sembrarono esserlo , da per tutto ritoccata ed ornata di un compendio della storia di tutti gli stati (1776)
Raccolta di tutti i viaggi fatti intorno al mondo (1789)
Gli Amanti repubbicani
Lettere di Niciea e Cinira (1782)Corso di Geografia storica, antica, e moderna del su Frédéric-Samuel Ostervald 1803Laura ed AugustoStoria de' tre viaggi intorno al mondo di Cook, ridotta a comune intelligenzaRousseau giustificato verso la sua patriaStato delle prigioni di Europa 1788'', translation of the work in English by John Howard

References

1737 births
1807 deaths
18th-century Swiss historians
Writers from Geneva